Chris Joss is a French multi-instrumentalist and record producer.

Early life and education

Chris Joss was born in France. According to his website "his parents enrolled him in electronic organ lessons aged 12 which taught him the basics of music", although he always wanted to play drums. When he was 14, he received an acoustic guitar and learnt playing autodidactically. In 1981, he founded his own band at high school. In 1984, after dropping out of school, "he began investing in recording and electronic equipment".

Career

In 1987, Joss released his first record with his 3 member band on EMI. In 1991, he released his third record on CBS with 7 member band. He moved to London, where he lived throughout the 1990s, until it became too expensive. In 1994 he played with a group called Monk and recorded and produced his first album.

Personal life
Joss has been suffering from misophonia since his childhood. He developed tinnitus and hyperacusis, and no longer performs live.

Work
His music ranges from funk to electronica, and tracks excerpted from his releases are featured in movie trailers such as Accepted (2006), Argo (2012), Hotel for Dogs (2009), Inside Deep Throat (2005), Ocean's Thirteen (2007), and Role Models (2008), and the television shows Six Feet Under and Better Call Saul.

His 1999 album The Man with a Suitcase was part of a trend in the late 1990s of "imaginary soundtracks", compositions created to accompany films that did not actually exist. In the soundtrack, he attempted to pay homage to works of the 1960s and 1970s such as The Avengers and Mission Impossible, with a mixture of jazz, pop, rock, and funk. His 2008 track "I want Freedom", taken from his fourth album, is part of Apple Inc.'s iPhoto 10 and iPhoto 11 software.

As of 2021, Joss had released twelve solo albums plus a remix album; five of them by ESL Music and six on his own Teraphonic Records.

Albums
The Man With A Suitcase (1999 Pulp Flavor) 
Dr Rhythm (2002 Irma)
You've Been Spiked (2004 ESL Music)  
Teraphonic Overdubs (2008 ESL Music) 
I've Been Remixed (2008 Teraphonic Records)
Sticks (2009 ESL Music) 
Monomaniacs Volume 1 (2010 ESL Music) 
No Play No Work (2011 ESL Music)
Bimbo Satellite (2014 Teraphonic Records)
Escape Unlikely (2016 Teraphonic Records)
Misophonia (2018 Teraphonic Records)
Monomaniacs Volume II (2019 Teraphonic Records)
Hyperacusis (2020 Teraphonic Records)

Singles
 Bombay By Bus 12 inch (1999 Pulp Flavor)
 The Gnomes 12 inch (2002 Irma)
 Discotheque Dancing 12 inch (2005 ESL Music)
 A Part In That Show 12 inch (2006 ESL Music)
 Brilliantine a gogo 12 inch (2006 Boutique Chic)
 Superman 12 inch (2007 ESL Music)
 I Want Freedom 12 inch (2008 ESL Music)
 Toxic Smoke/Sequence of Spectators 7 inch (2012 ESL Music)

Remixes

 Jody Watley - Borderline CD (2008 Curvve Recordings)
 Pirates of the Caribbean: Dead Man's Chest - He's A Pirate 2x12 inch & CD (2006 Walt Disney) 
 Jody Watley - Looking For A New Love CD (2005 Curvve Recordings)
 Joe Bataan - Chick A Boom CD (2006 ESL Music) 
 Woody Herman - Mambo Herd CD (2006 Sunswept)
 Thunderball - Thunder In The Jungle 12 inch (2007 ESL Music)
 Praful - Sigh CD (2007 Therapy Records)
 Bebo Valdes - Ita Morales CD (2008 Essential Media Group)
  AM & Shawn Lee - I Didn't Really Listen (ESL Music 2012)
 Yerba Buena - Sugar Daddy CD (2005 Razor and Tie)

Production
 Monk - Ten Tips For Charles Berry's Hips" (1995 Station Records)
 Cazwell - I buy my socks on 14th Street 2 versions (2006 West End Records/2008 Peace Bisquit)
 Cazwell - The Sex That I Need (2006 West End Records/2008 Peace Bisquit)
 Los Amigos Invisibles - Corduroy (2009 Unreleased)

Other releases
 Inside Deep Throat Original Soundtrack CD (2006 Koch Records) 
 Stereoscope Jerk Explosion - La Panthere Pop (2008 Cosmic Groove) Sitar on 2 tracks
 Atfunk - Rewire Walks (2008 Extremely House Music) keyboard on 3 tracks
 Atfunk - Soundprism ''(2012 Plugtone records) keyboards on Restart and Tranquilito

External links
Official website

Resources

Living people
Year of birth missing (living people)